The 1981 FA Trophy Final was the 12th final of the FA Trophy, the Football Association's cup competition for non-League teams. It was contested by Bishop's Stortford and Sutton United. Bishop's Stortford won the match 1–0 with Terry Sullivan scoring the goal in the 90th minute.


Final

References

External links
 1980–81 FA Trophy on the Football Club History Database

FA Trophy Finals
Fa Trophy
Fa Trophy Final 1981
Fa Trophy Final 1981
Fa Trophy Final
Events at Wembley Stadium